Ephelis flavomarginalis is a moth in the family Crambidae. It is found in the United Arab Emirates and Iran.

References

Moths described in 1951
Odontiini